Paul Joseph Kelly Jr. (born 1940) is a senior United States circuit judge of the United States Court of Appeals for the Tenth Circuit. His chambers are in Santa Fe, New Mexico.

Education and career

Born in Freeport, New York, Kelly received a Bachelor of Business Administration degree from the University of Notre Dame in 1963 and a Juris Doctor from Fordham University School of Law in 1967. Kelly began his career at the law firm Cravath, Swaine, and Moore in New York City. He was then in private practice with the firm Hinkle, Bondurant, Cox & Eaton in Roswell and Santa Fe, New Mexico from 1967 to 1992. Kelly was a highly successful jury trial attorney.  Upon returning to his office after each successful trial result, his staff would inquire about the result and Kelly's response was always, "Does a cat have a tail?" Kelly approached his practice in a relentless fashion, insisting that every angle of a case be investigated.  He always enjoyed teaching young lawyers.

He was a New Mexico state representative from 1977 to 1981.

Federal judicial service

On November 19, 1991, Kelly was nominated by President George H. W. Bush to a new seat on the United States Court of Appeals for the Tenth Circuit created by 104 Stat. 5089. He was confirmed by the United States Senate on April 8, 1992, and received his commission on April 13, 1992. He assumed senior status on December 31, 2017.

Honors and other interests

In October 2008, Judge Kelly was honored in the Great Hall of the United States Supreme Court Building with the Professionalism Award of the American Inns of Court for the Tenth Circuit.

Kelly still works as a volunteer fire and emergency service volunteer. He is also an avid golfer and skier.

Judicial philosophy

A law review article entitled "Who Would Win a Tournament of Judges" lists Kelly as one of the most commonly cited appellate judges currently serving. Only Judge Posner and Judge Easterbrook consistently bested Kelly. Kelly stated in an Above the Law article that he has no set judicial philosophy—he has decisions landing on both sides of the spectrum.

References

Sources
 

1940 births
20th-century American judges
Fordham University School of Law alumni
Judges of the United States Court of Appeals for the Tenth Circuit
Living people
Members of the New Mexico House of Representatives
People from Freeport, New York
United States court of appeals judges appointed by George H. W. Bush
University of Notre Dame alumni